Cipières is a commune in the Alpes-Maritimes department in southeastern France.

Cipieres is about 50 minutes drive from the French Riviera, and is an unspoilt medieval village of around 500 inhabitants. There are two restaurants, a pizzeria and a general store. Sheep are farmed on the surrounding mountain side and a farm sells lamb direct and also makes a renowned goats cheese. There is an annual free rock festival (Ciprock) as well as a homemade kart race through the narrow streets, attracting children as well as some more serious adults.

It enjoys a beautiful climate and has far reaching views across the valley of the wolf to the peak of Mount Cheiron, with the village of Greolieres in the foreground.

Population

See also
Communes of the Alpes-Maritimes department

References

Communes of Alpes-Maritimes
Alpes-Maritimes communes articles needing translation from French Wikipedia